Michael Bergan is a member of the Iowa House of Representatives from House District 63. He has served as a Republican in the Iowa House of Representatives since January 2017. Bergan is a resident of Winneshiek County, Iowa.

During the 2017 legislative session, Bergan served on the following committees in the Iowa House of Representatives: Human Resources (Vice Chair), State Government, and Ways and Means.

References

External links 
Official site on Republican Party's page

Republican Party members of the Iowa House of Representatives
Living people
People from Winneshiek County, Iowa
Luther College (Iowa) alumni
21st-century American politicians
1962 births